Áine Brazil is an Irish engineer.

A chartered engineer, Brazil is a fellow of Engineers Ireland and vice chair of Thornton Tomasetti, a New York engineering firm. A graduate of the University of Galway, Brazil won the award for International Engineer of the Year at the Engineers Ireland Excellence Awards in 2014. She was conferred with a Doctor of Engineering (honoris causa) by NUI Galway in June 2015.

Brazil was elected a member of the National Academy of Engineering in 2018 for her leadership in the design of innovative buildings and contributions to engineering literacy.

References

External links
 
 
 https://connachttribune.ie/tag/aine-brazil/
 https://www.thorntontomasetti.com/people/aine_brazil/
 http://www.engineersjournal.ie/2017/06/20/aine-brazil-thornton-tomasetti-engineer/
 http://www.engineersjournal.ie/2018/07/24/world-renowned-galway-engineer-aine-brazil-honoured-concern-worldwide/
 http://www.nui.ie/college/docs/citations/2015/nuig/Brazil_Aine.pdf
 https://www.nytimes.com/2014/05/04/realestate/a-shoulder-for-buildings-to-lean-on.html

Year of birth missing (living people)
Place of birth missing (living people)
Living people
Alumni of the University of Galway
Irish architects
Irish businesspeople
Irish engineers
People from County Galway
20th-century Irish people
21st-century Irish people